The 1980 United States Grand Prix was a Formula One motor race held on October 5, 1980 at the Watkins Glen Grand Prix Race Course in Watkins Glen, New York. This event was also referred to as the United States Grand Prix East in order to distinguish it from the United States Grand Prix West held on March 30, 1980 in Long Beach, California.

It was the fourteenth and final race of the 1980 Formula One season. The race was the 30th United States Grand Prix, the 20th and last to be held at Watkins Glen, and the last to be held for nine years (other Formula One races were held in the United States during that time, but none were billed as the United States Grand Prix).

The race was won by the new World Champion, Australian driver Alan Jones, driving a Williams FW07B. It was Jones' fifth World Championship Formula One victory of the season and the sixth of the seven Grands Prix (including Spain and Australia) he would win in his career defining season. Jones won by four seconds over his Argentine team mate Carlos Reutemann with French driver Didier Pironi finishing third in his Ligier JS11/15. Two former World Champions, Emerson Fittipaldi and Jody Scheckter, retired after the race, although Fittipaldi would later return to racing in the American CART series.

Summary
 
Frank Williams' first Championship season, his eleventh as an owner, ended in style with another victory by team leader and new Driver's Champion Alan Jones, but this was the last Grand Prix to be held on the historic Watkins Glen course in the wooded hills at the foot of Seneca Lake. The Glen's demise came about when attempts to resurface the track proved not to be enough, runoff areas became too short for the speeds produced, and attendance was not what it had been, for even this race had been in doubt until just a month before.

As the track's last Grand Prix weekend got under way, the big surprise of qualifying was the Alfa Romeo of Italian Bruno Giacomelli, who was quickest in both Friday's and Saturday's sessions, averaging . Giacomelli took the only pole of his 69-race career, and the first for Alfa Romeo since 1951, by three-quarters of a second over a tightly-bunched group including Nelson Piquet's Brabham, Carlos Reutemann's Williams, Elio de Angelis' Lotus and Jones in the second Williams.

Race day threatened rain, but none appeared. Alain Prost, completing his first F1 season had a heavy crash at Turn 10 during Friday practice. He hit his head on his McLaren's steering wheel and suffered a concussion, forcing him to miss the race. This enabled Dutchman Jan Lammers to start the race, and Prost, already having suffered 8 previous mechanical failures during the season chose to leave McLaren for the factory Renault team. At the start, Giacomelli got off the line well and led into the first turn. Jones rocketed forward from fifth on the grid to second entering Turn One, but he could not hold his line through the turn. He, along with Giacomelli's teammate Andrea de Cesaris swung wide onto the dirt, then collected himself and continued, finishing the first lap in fourteenth place.

At the end of a lap, Giacomelli had opened a gap back to Piquet, followed by Reutemann, Didier Pironi, de Angelis and Héctor Rebaque. In two more laps, the Alfa was ahead by two and a half seconds. Meanwhile, Jones was battling his way back through the field, and on lap 7, he was already poking around the gearbox of John Watson's McLaren, trying to take seventh place. Watson held him off until the tenth lap, and, once by, Jones quickly pulled away after de Angelis and Pironi.

Giacomelli continued to set an even pace, and his lead was ten seconds on lap 21, with Reutemann now threatening Piquet, whose tires were beginning to go off. Jones had caught up to de Angelis, and on the next lap, got around him for fifth.

Reutemann's pressure, and the Brabham's increasing lack of grip, finally got to Piquet on lap 26 as he spun off in turn one. The off-road excursion damaged a skirt, and he retired after reaching the pits. Three laps later, Jones passed Pironi for third, as the Ligier was also suffering from tire wear.

The only car between Jones and the leader now was teammate Reutemann, but with the Driver's Championship already in Jones' hands, there would be no team orders. Understeer induced by a worn left front tire was plaguing the Argentine, however, and Jones easily overcame him on lap 30 and set his sights on Giacomelli, now 12 seconds ahead. The red and white Alfa Romeo coasted to a halt in the Boot on lap 32 with electrical trouble. Once in the lead, Jones went faster and faster, finally doing a 1:34.068 on lap 44, better than his qualifying time.

When Watson pitted to replace a broken shock absorber on his McLaren, crowd favorite Mario Andretti moved up to the final points position. A set of new tires allowed René Arnoux to catch and pass the American, but a broken skirt soon slowed the Renault, and Andretti was able to regain the sixth spot and score his only point of the season.

The Williams team celebrated the climax to a year in which they had taken the Driver's and Constructor's Championships by waving a huge Union Flag at their one-two finish. The race saw not only the end of Formula One at Watkins Glen, but former champions Emerson Fittipaldi and Jody Scheckter's last Grand Prix and Mario Andretti's last race for Colin Chapman and Lotus. This Grand Prix would also witness the final occasion where a privateer entry would be classified as a finisher with Rupert Keegan finishing in 9th place in a RAM Racing-entered Williams FW07.

Classification

Qualifying 

= Mansell was originally entered in this race, but Andretti used the car originally allocated to Mansell after Andretti wrote off his car during the Canadian Grand Prix one week earlier. Jabouille was also entered in this race, but had to miss out due to leg injuries sustained at the same Canadian race.

Race

Championship standings after the race

Drivers' Championship standings

Constructors' Championship standings

References

Further reading
 Rob Walker (January, 1981). "22nd United States Grand Prix: Final Round". Road & Track, 110-113.

United States Grand Prix
United States Grand Prix
1980 in sports in New York (state)
United States Grand Prix